Nathaniel Gould  (c. 1697–1738), of Crosby Square, London, was a British financier and politician who sat in the House of Commons from 1729 to 1734.

Gould was the second son of John Gould of Woodford, Essex. He was a Director of the  Bank of England between 1722 and 1737, with statutory intervals.
 
Gould was returned as Member of Parliament for Wareham at a by-election on 12 February 1729. He consistently supported the Administration. He was a member of Samuel Holden's dissenting deputies committee who discussed the repeal of the Test and Corporation Acts with Walpole in November 1732 and December 1734. He lost his seat at the 1734 British general election, and did not stand again.

Gould married Jane Thayer, daughter  of Humphrey Thayer of Hatton Garden, London in November 1734. In 1737  he became deputy governor of the Bank of England. He died without issue on 30 March 1738.

References

1690s births
1738 deaths
Members of the Parliament of Great Britain for English constituencies
British MPs 1727–1734